It was opened in 1926 as a result of Róbert Szieberth’s idea. At the beginning it was called People’s Elementary School of Ullmann-telep   and it was housed at the building of current nursery school. Here were two classrooms in the first three years. It had 56, 120 and 181 students in 2, 4 and 6 classes respectively. Szieberth was the one, who proposed the building of the current building of the school. Since 1930 the school is also gets the name of the street where it is located.

Sources

External links 
 Kelemen Sándorné visszaemlékezései

Buildings and structures in Pécs
Organisations based in Pécs
1926 establishments in Hungary